Minnesota NSC United was an American soccer team, founded in 2005. The team was a member of the National Premier Soccer League (NPSL), the fourth tier of the American Soccer Pyramid, and played in the Midwest Conference. 

During its inaugural 2005 season the team played as Minnesota Blast, and were based at the SoccerBlast facility in Burnsville, Minnesota. The new incarnation of the team are affiliated with, and play their home matches at, the National Sports Center in the city of Blaine, Minnesota, 16 miles north of downtown Minneapolis.

In 2006 the team's management announced that they would spend the 2007 NPSL season on hiatus. This team now no longer exists.

Year-by-year

External links
National Sports Center

National Premier Soccer League teams
Defunct soccer clubs in Minnesota
Burnsville, Minnesota
Anoka County, Minnesota
2005 establishments in Minnesota